The United States Army Women's Museum is located in Fort Lee, Virginia. It provides exhibits and information related to the role of women in the United States Army, especially the Women's Army Corps.

The museum was originally established in 1955 as the Women's Army Corps Museum in Fort McClellan, Alabama. When Fort McClellan closed in 1999, the museum was relocated to Fort Lee and reopened in 2001 as the U.S. Army Women's Museum.  In November 2013, the museum became the site of the first statue of a female soldier on a US Army installation.

One of the current and ongoing projects of the museum is the collection of oral histories of women who have served in the Army.  The museum currently has over 100 histories in its collection and continues to gather oral histories from female servicemembers.

The mission of the U.S. Army Women's Museum is to collect, preserve, research, exhibit and interpret historically significant properties related to service of women across all branches and organizations of the United States Army from inception to present day. A secondary purpose of the museum will be to support military training and education of women through its exhibitions, publications, educational programs, and outreach activities.

See also
 History of women in the military
 Women in the United States Army

References

External links
 United States Army Women's Museum official website
 Kappa Epsilon Psi Military Sorority, Inc - National Veterans Sorority
 Women in the U.S. Army
 WWII: Women in the Fight - slideshow by Life magazine

Military and war museums in Virginia
Museum
Women's museums in the United States
Women's Museum
Museums in Prince George County, Virginia
Museums established in 1955
1955 establishments in Alabama